Quido Adamec (15 December 1924 – 22 July 2007) was a Czech ice hockey referee. Adamec worked as an official at seven Ice Hockey World Championships and was the chairman for the Czech referee committee. He also sat on the International Ice Hockey Federation (IIHF) referee's committee. Adamec was inducted into the IIHF Hall of Fame in 2005 before his death in 2007. In 2016, he was posthumously inducted into the Czech Hockey Hall of Fame.

References

1924 births
2007 deaths
Czech ice hockey officials
Czech sports executives and administrators
Czechoslovak sportsmen
Ice hockey people from Prague
IIHF Hall of Fame inductees